Euro Force may refer to:

 Europol, European police intelligence agency
 Military of the European Union
 European Defence Force
 Battlefield 2: Euro Force, expansion pack to the video game Battlefield 2